Business Plus can refer to:

 Business Plus (magazine), an Irish business magazine published in Dublin
 Business Plus (publisher), an imprint of Grand Central Publishing
 Business Plus (TV Channel), a 24-hour Pakistani business channel